Puiseux-Pontoise is a commune in the Val-d'Oise department in Île-de-France in northern France.

Education
The commune has a single primary school, école du Vieux Noyer. Junior high school students attend Collège Sainte Appoline in Courdimanche and senior high school students may attend Lycée Jules Verne or Lycée Général et Technologique Galilée, both in Cergy.

See also
Communes of the Val-d'Oise department

References

External links

Home page 

Association of Mayors of the Val d'Oise 

Communes of Val-d'Oise
Cergy-Pontoise